The 2003 PARA Pan American Championship was the last and fifth edition of this rugby union tournament.

It was held in Buenos Aires and was an important step for the four team to prepare the 2003 Rugby World Cup

As the previous four was won by Argentina.

Standings 
{| class="wikitable"
|-
!width=165|Team
!width=40|Played
!width=40|Won
!width=40|Drawn
!width=40|Lost
!width=40|For
!width=40|Against
!width=40|Difference
!width=40|Pts
|- bgcolor=#ccffcc align=center
|align=left| 
|3||3||0||0||161||30||+131||6
|- align=center
|align=left| 
|3||2||0||1||74||79||−5||4
|- align=center
|align=left| 
|3||1||0||2||63||108||−45||2
|- align=center
|align=left| 
|3||0||0||3||28||109||−81||0
|}

Results

References 

 IRB – Pan American Championship
 
 

2003
2003 rugby union tournaments for national teams
International rugby union competitions hosted by Argentina
2003 in South American rugby union
2003 in North American rugby union
2003 in Argentine rugby union
2003 in Canadian rugby union
2003 in American rugby union
rugby union
2003